Manasukketha Maharasa is a 1989 Indian Tamil-language film, directed by Dheenadhayaal and produced by A. R. Santhilal Nahar and S. Gowri Gurukkal. The story is written by Agathiyan, credited as Karunanidhi Santharam onscreen. The film stars Ramarajan, Seetha, Nizhalgal Ravi and Goundamani.

Plot 

Raja, an unemployed graduate moves to a neighboring village in search of a job as he is insulted by his uncle, who threatens to send his mother out of the house, he falls for Thenmozhi, Her uncle creates problem for them how he overcomes them and succeeds in his love is the rest of the film.

Cast 

Ramarajan
Seetha
Nizhalgal Ravi
Goundamani
Vinu Chakravarthy
Senthil
Madhuri
Chinni Jayanth
Peeli Sivam
Thideer Kannaiah
Master Haja Sheriff
Seethalakshmi
Jokker Thulasi
Girish
Azhagu
K. K. Sami
Senchi Krishnan
Thirai Needhi Selvam
N. Pallavan

Soundtrack 
The music was composed by Deva. Lyrics written by Pulamaipithan and Kalidasan in pen name of "Thirupathooran". Even though Deva made his debut with the film Mattukara Mannaru (1986), it was this film which gave him a break as a composer.

References

External links 
 

1980s Tamil-language films
1989 films
Films scored by Deva (composer)